Istihlal ( istiḥlāl) is a term used in Islamic jurisprudence, or fiqh, to refer to the act of regarding some action as permissible, or halaal, although it is haraam; the implication is that such a regard is an erroneous and improper distortion of Islamic law.  The word "istihlal" is derived as Stem X of the Arabic consonantal root ح-ل-ل meaning "to untie", "to solve", "to dissolve", "to open", "to release", etc. 

The term "istihlal" came to prominence in the Western news media on 11 March 2005, the first anniversary of the Madrid bombing attacks of 2004, when the Islamic Commission of Spain (La Comisión Islámica de España) issued a fatwa, or religious opinion, denouncing Osama bin Laden and al-Qaeda for engaging in istihlal with respect to the waging of jihad through terrorism, and the killing of women, children, and noncombatants. 

The relevant passages from the fatwa are as follows: 

Que según la Sharia, todo aquel que declara halal o permitido lo que Dios ha declarado haram o prohibido, como es matar a personas inocentes en atentados terroristas, se convierte en Kafir Murtadd Mustahlil, es decir en apóstata, por haber pretendido hacer halal (istihlal) el asesinato de inocentes, crimen que el Sagrado Corán y la Sunna del Profeta Muhammad, Dios le bendiga y salve, prohíben expresamente.

En tanto que Osama ben Laden y su organización defienden la legalidad del terrorismo y pretenden fundamentarla en el sagrado Corán y la Sunna, están cometiendo delito de istihlal y se convierten ipso facto en apóstatas (kafir murtadd), que no deben ser considerados musulmanes ni ser tratados como tales.

Translated into English: 

That according to the Sharia, anyone who declares halaal, or permitted, what God has declared haraam, or forbidden, such as the killing of innocent persons in terrorist attacks, turns into a Kafir Murtadd Mustahlil, that is to say, an apostate, by having claimed to make halal (istihlal) the murder of innocents, a crime that the Holy Qur'an and the Sunnah of the Prophet Muhammad (may God bless and save him) expressly forbid.

Insofar as Osama bin Laden and his organization defend the legality of terrorism and claim to base it in the Holy Qur'an and the Sunnah, they are committing the sin of istihlal and become ipso facto apostates (kafir murtadd), who should not be considered Muslims nor be treated as such.

References

External links 
 "Text of the Fatwa Declared Against Osama Bin Laden by the Islamic Commission of Spain."  Translated into English by Liza Sabater.

Arabic words and phrases in Sharia
Islamic terminology
Islamic jurisprudence